Tyler Edtmayer (born 26 December 2000 in Lenggries) is a German skateboarder. He has competed in men's park events at several World Skate Championships, finishing 24th in 2018 and 18th in 2019.

He is set to compete in the men's park event at the 2021 Tokyo Olympics.

References 

2000 births
Living people
German skateboarders
Olympic skateboarders of Germany
Skateboarders at the 2020 Summer Olympics
People from Bad Tölz-Wolfratshausen
Sportspeople from Upper Bavaria
German people of American descent
21st-century German people